Regents Park railway station is located on the Main South line, serving the Sydney suburb of Regents Park. The station is heritage-listed in the state heritage register for New South Wales. It is served by Sydney Trains T3 Bankstown line services.

History
The original Regents Park station opened on 11 November 1912 when a line was built from Lidcombe. 
The station was moved in 1924 when the Main South line was extended to Cabramatta in an attempt to reduce overcrowding on the Main Western railway line. The new station opened on 8 October 1924, built in a characteristic standard design of this period.

A booking and parcels office was constructed on the footbridge as part of the 1924 station. This was replaced with the present building in 1945, and later converted into a kiosk. 

In 2001, a lift was installed from the footbridge down to the platform, and new canopies built connecting to the platform buildings.

Immediately south of the station lies Sefton Park Junction with services heading south to Bankstown via the Bankstown line and west to Liverpool via the Main South line. The Southern Sydney Freight Line passes beneath the junction. Until it closed in April 1966, Regents Park was the junction for a line to Potts Hill Reservoir and sidings serving an industrial complex to the north-west of the station.

Platforms & services
Historically Regents Park was served by services from the city and Lidcombe operating to Bankstown and Liverpool on an alternate basis. This changed in the early 2000s, when most services to Liverpool were altered to operate via Bankstown. Today Regents Park is served by T3 Bankstown line services terminating at Lidcombe and three Liverpool – City via Strathfield services on weekdays.

Transport links
Transdev NSW operate two routes via Regents Park station:
 908: Bankstown station to Merrylands station
 909: Bankstown station to Parramatta station

Regents Park station is served by one NightRide route:
 N50: Liverpool to City (Town Hall)

References

External links
 
 Regents Park station details Transport for New South Wales

Easy Access railway stations in Sydney
Railway stations in Sydney
Railway stations in Australia opened in 1912
Railway stations in Australia opened in 1924
Main Southern railway line, New South Wales
Cumberland Council, New South Wales